Prostemmatinae is a subfamily of damsel bugs in the family Nabidae. 

In America, there are at least 13 described species in Prostemmatinae.

Genera
There are two tribes:

Phorticini
 Phorticus Stål, 1860
 Rhamphocoris Kirkaldy, 1901

Prostemmatini
 Alloeorhynchus Fieber, 1860
 Pagasa Stål, 1862
 Prostemma Laporte, 1832

References

 Thomas J. Henry, Richard C. Froeschner. (1988). Catalog of the Heteroptera, True Bugs of Canada and the Continental United States. Brill Academic Publishers.

Further reading

External links

 NCBI Taxonomy Browser, Prostemmatinae

Nabidae